Events in the year 1999 in China.

Incumbents 
 Party General Secretary – Jiang Zemin
 President – Jiang Zemin
 Premier – Zhu Rongji
 Vice President – Hu Jintao
 Vice Premier – Li Lanqing
 Congress Chairman – Li Peng
 Conference Chairman – Li Ruihuan

Governors  
 Governor of Anhui Province – Wang Taihua 
 Governor of Fujian Province – He Guoqiang then Xi Jinping 
 Governor of Gansu Province – Song Zhaosu 
 Governor of Guangdong Province – Lu Ruihua 
 Governor of Guizhou Province – Qian Yunlu 
 Governor of Hainan Province – Wang Xiaofeng 
 Governor of Hebei Province – Yue Qifeng
 Governor of Heilongjiang Province – Tian Fengshan 
 Governor of Henan Province – Li Keqiang 
 Governor of Hubei Province – Jiang Zhuping 
 Governor of Hunan Province – Chu Bo 
 Governor of Jiangsu Province – Ji Yunshi
 Governor of Jiangxi Province – Shu Shengyou 
 Governor of Jilin Province – Hong Hu
 Governor of Liaoning Province – Zhang Guoguang 
 Governor of Qinghai Province – Bai Enpei then Zhao Leji 
 Governor of Shaanxi Province – Cheng Andong 
 Governor of Shandong Province – Li Chunting
 Governor of Shanxi Province – Sun Wensheng then Liu Zhenhua 
 Governor of Sichuan Province – Song Baorui then Zhang Zhongwei 
 Governor of Yunnan Province – Li Jiating 
 Governor of Zhejiang Province – Chai Songyue

Events

January
 January 4 – A pedestrian bridge in Qijiang, Chongqing collapsed and caused 40 people to die and 14 to be injured.

February
 February 24 – China Southwest Airlines Flight 4509 crashed on approach to Wenzhou Airport, killing 61 people.

April
 April 4 – Alibaba Group founded in Hangzhou, Zhejiang Province.
 April 15 – Korean Air Cargo Flight 6316 crashed in Xinzhuang, Shanghai after takeoff from Hongqiao Airport due to pilot's confusion between two units of measurement (feet and metres).

May
 May 8 – U.S. bombing of the Chinese embassy in Belgrade led to a series of anti-American protests in China.

July
 July 22 – The Ministry of Civil Affairs declared Falun Gong as an illegal organization.

October
 October 1 – 50th anniversary of the founding of the People's Republic Parade and Speech by paramount leader Jiang Zemin.

November
 November 19 – Shenzhou 1 spacecraft launched.

December
 December 5 – Shenyang Haishi won Chongqing Longxin by 2-1 in the Chinese Jia-A League, which later led to a match-fixing controversy.
 December 19 and 20 – China assumed formal sovereignty over Macau from Portugal.

Full date unknown
GRG Banking is founded in Guangzhou.

Births
 February 10 – Tiffany Espensen, actress
 June 2 – Wei Yi, chess prodigy
 September 9 – Uudam, singer

See also
 List of Chinese films of 1999

References

 
Years of the 20th century in China